Paul Haarhuis was the defending champion but lost in the semifinals to Younes El Aynaoui.

Sjeng Schalken won in the final 6–3, 6–2 against El Aynaoui.

Seeds
A champion seed is indicated in bold text while text in italics indicates the round in which that seed was eliminated.

Draw

References
 1996 Indonesia Open Draw

Jakarta Open
1996 ATP Tour